Zapaden Park Metro station is a station on the Sofia Metro in Bulgaria.  It opened on 28 January 1998.

Interchange with other public transport
 Tramway service: 8
 City Bus service: 310

Location

External links

 Sofia Metropolitan (Official site)
 Unofficial site
 360 degree panorama from outside the station (west end)

Sofia Metro stations
Railway stations opened in 1998
1998 establishments in Bulgaria